Ihor Kizyma (born 31 March 1997 in Lviv, Ukraine) is a Ukrainian sport shooter. He is the 2022 World Champion and 2019 European silver and bronze medallist.

Career
Kizyma came into the sport at the age of 9. His first coach was Volodymyr Yurchenko. He became a two-time World junior champion in 2016 in Suhl, Germany. He is also multiple World and European junior champion and medallist.

At the 2019 European championships in Osijek, Croatia, he won a silver and a bronze medal for the first time in his career at the senior level.

Kizyma won his first World title at the 2022 World Championships in French Châteauroux where he won the 50 metre running target competition.

Personal life
Kizyma studied at the Lviv Sports Professional College. He serves in the Armed Forces of Ukraine and is junior sergeant.

References

External links
 Profile at the ISSF site

1997 births
Living people
Ukrainian male sport shooters
Sportspeople from Lviv
ISSF pistol shooters
21st-century Ukrainian people